Cardin is a surname. Notable people with the surname include:

Alberto Cardín (1948–1992), Spanish essayist and anthropologist
Annie Cardin (born 1938), French artist
Arthur Cardin (1879–1946), Canadian politician
Ben Cardin (born 1943), Senator from Maryland
Charlotte Cardin (born 1994), Canadian pop singer
Claude Cardin (born 1941), Canadian ice-hockey player
Denny Cardin (born 1988), Italian footballer
Jessica Cardin, American neuroscientist
Jon S. Cardin (born 1970), American politician, nephew of Ben Cardin
Louis-Pierre-Paul Cardin (1840–1917), Canadian politician
Lucien Cardin (1919–1988), Canadian lawyer, judge and politician
Margaret Cardin (1906-1998), Australian film editor
Maurice Cardin (1909–2009), American politician
Meyer Cardin (1907–2005), American judge, father of Ben Cardin
Nina Beth Cardin, American rabbi and author
Pierre Cardin (1922–2020), Italian/French fashion designer
Sara Cardin, (born 1987), Italian karateka 
Serge Cardin (born 1950), Canadian former Member of Parliament

See also
Cardin, Oklahoma, a ghost town
Colisée Cardin, an indoor arena in Quebec, Canada